Ollie Shepard (né Oliver Shepard; born July 1909, Oberlin, Louisiana, United States – 1960) was an American blues pianist, vocalist, and songwriter.

Career 
From about 1954 to about 1963, Shepard performed at Jerry's Restaurant & Cocktail Lounge in Oneonta, New York, at 15 Dietz Street, in the Walnut Street Historic District.  The restaurant was owned by Joseph G. ("Jerry") Monser (1926–1975), who opened it on August 5, 1954.  The building was demolished in July 1970 to make way for a parking lot.  Mark Bresee, et al., purchased the property from Robert W. Melmer, his father, John J. Melmer, and his brother, John E. Melmer.

Poet and academician Richard George Frost (born 1929) who, for a stint, had played drums with Shepard in a lounge in Oneonta described him as follows:
 Ollie, who had once been a house pianist for Decca Records, was a tyrant. The arrogant cuss seemed determined to derange me. He played in a fast, galloping blues-based format that often threw me. When he believed I had lagged or faltered, he would make unpleasant faces and groan loudly at his honky drummer.

Selected discography 
 Original releases
 Ollie Shepard and His Kentucky Boys, Decca Records
 Ollie Shepard (vocalist), Chu Berry (tenor sax), Sammy Price (piano), (unknown) (drums)

Decca 7400
Side X – C91348: "Honey Bee" (1937)
Side X – C91350: "Sweetheart Land" (1937)

Decca 7408
Side X – C91349: "No One To Call You Dear" (1937)
Side X – C91347: "She Walks Like A Kangaroo" (1937)

Decca 7463
Side X – 63514-A: "What's Your Guess?" (1938)
Side X – 63510-A: "Good Woman"  (1938)

Decca 7665
Side X – 65975-A: "Baby It's My Time Now" (1939)
Side X – 65973-A: "King of All Evil"

Decca 7480
Side X – 63513-A: "Biscuit Rolling Time" (1938)
Side X – 63515-B: "Hope You Haven't Forgotten Me" (1938)

Decca 7508
Side X – 63796-A: "Frankenstein Blues" (1938)
Side X – 63795-A: "Little Pigmeat" (1938)

Decca 7435
Side X – 63512-A: "Drunk Again" (1938)
Side X – 63507-A: "One Woman Blues" (1938)

Decca 7651
Side X – 65971-A: "Don't You Know?" (1939)
Side X – 65974-A: "Lil Liza Jane" (1939)

Decca 7629
Side A – 65422-A: "Sweetest Thing Born"
 Recorded in New York City April 18, 1939
Side B – 65972-A: "Jelly Roll"
 Recorded in New York City June 17, 1939
 

 Decca 7602
Side A – 65425-A: "Sugar Woman Blues" (1939)
Side B – 65423-A: "Shepard Blues" ("Pig Latin Blues") (1939)

Decca 7541
Side A – 63511-A: "Pee Wee, Pee Wee" (1938)
Side B – 63516-A: "At Your Mercy" (1938)

Decca 7493
Side A – 63793-A: "Solid Jack" (1938)
 
Side B – 63794-A: "This Place Is Leaping" (1938)

Decca 7585
Side A – 65420-A: "New Low Down Dirty Shame"
 Recorded in New York City April 18, 1939
 
Side B – 65421-A: "The Numbers Blues"
 

Decca 7613
Side A – 65427-A: "My Dripping Blood Blues"
 Recorded in New York City April 18, 1939
 
Side B – 65424-A: "Outdoor Blues"
 (add Lonnie Johnson, guitar)
 Recorded in New York City April 18, 1939

 Decca 7639
Side A – 65428-A: "Blues 'bout My Gal"
 Recorded in New York City April 18, 1939
 
Side B – 65970-A: "Oh Maria"
 Recorded in New York City July 17, 1939

Decca 7448
Side A – 63509-A: "S-B-A Blues"
 Recorded in New York City March 31, 1938
 
Side B – 63508-A: "Brown Skin Woman"
 Recorded in New York City March 31, 1938
 

Decca 7716
Side A – 65426-A: "Hell Is So Low Down" (1939)
Side B – 67083-A: "Octavia Blues" (1940)

Decca 7805
Side A: "You Got Me Wandering" (1940)
Side B – 67084-A: "I'm Stepping Out Tonight" (1940)

Decca 7761
Side X – 67082-A: "Jitterbugs Broke Down" (1940)
Side X – 65970-A: "Oh Maria" (1940)
 Ollie Shepard
 Ollie Shepard (vocalist, piano), accompanied by Ted McCord (clarinet, tenor sax), George Francis (guitar), Johnny Wells (drums), unknown female (vocal 1)
 Recorded in New York City, May 2, 1941
Okeh 06277
Side A – 30392-1: "Cool Kind Papa"
Side B – 30394-1: "Throw This Dog A Bone"

Okeh 06409
Side A – 30397-1: "Army Camp Blues"
Side B – 30391-1: "Hard Times Is On Me"

 Okeh 06533
Side A – 30396-1: "Pay Day Blues"
Side B – 30393-1: "True Love Blues"
 Ollie Shepard with Hot Lips Page & His Orchestra
 Ollie Shepard (vocalist, piano), accompanied by Hot Lips Page (trumpet), Alfred Cobbs (trombone), Vincent Bey (alto and baritone sax), Buddy Tate (tenor sax), Carl "Flat Top" Wilson (bass), Clay Burt (drums)
 Recorded in New York City, November 1, 1950
 Okeh 6840
Side A – CO44587: "Baby Blues"
Side B – CO44588: "Don't Come Knockin' Upon My Door"

 Curatorial discography (re-issues and compilations)

 Ollie Shepard, Complete Recorded Works, Document Records (1996)
 Vol. 1; 28 October 1937 to 18 April 1939; 
 Vol. 2; 18 April 1939 to 2 May 1941;

Selected compositions 

 "It's A Low Down Dirty Shame" (1938)
 State Street Music Pub. Co.
 
 "Sweetheart Land" (1938)
 State Street Music Pub. Co.
 "I'm Going Back To Kokomo" (1943)
 Ollie Shephard (sic) (w&m)
 Charling Music Corp.
 "Exactly What I Need" (1943)
 Ollie Shephard (sic) (w&m)
 Charling Music Corp.
 "Good Old Tennessee" (1944)
 Ollie Shepard (w&m)
 "Take Everything There Is" ("But Leave Me You") (1944)
 Ollie Shepard (w&m)
 "It's A Low Down Dirty Shame" (1946)
 "Do You Wonder Why?" (1953)
 Ollie Shepard (w&m)
 "Tee Nay" (1956)
 Ollie Shepard (w&m)
 Charles K. Harris Music Pub. Co., Inc.
 "Restless As The River" (1956)
 Ollie Shepard & Sammy Gallop (w&m)
 Charles K. Harris Music Pub. Co., Inc.
 "Stepping Out" (1956)
 Ollie Shepard (w&m)
 Peer International Corp.
 "That's What True Love Can Do" (1956)
 Ollie Shepard (w&m)
 Peer International Corp.
 "I'll Never Make You Blue" (1957)
 
 "Hot Dawg" (1957)
 Ollie Shepard (w&m)
 Desired Music, Inc.
 "Now I Know" (1959)
 Ollie Shepard (w&m)
 Cincinnati: Jay & Cee Music Corp.
 
 "If You Want Me To" (1960)
 Ollie Shepard (w&m)
 "Sweetheart" (1960)
 "You Care" (1960)
 
 "Jitterbugs Broke It Down" (1967)
 Ollie Shepard (w&m)
 "My Babe Is Gone" (1957)
 "Sweetie Pie" (1957)
 "Regardless" (1957)
 "You Better Believe It" (1957)

References 

1909 births
American blues pianists
American male pianists
People from Oberlin, Louisiana
African-American jazz pianists
20th-century American pianists
1960 deaths
Jazz musicians from Louisiana
20th-century American male musicians
American male jazz musicians
20th-century African-American musicians